Angela Ianaro is an Italian politician. She was elected to be a deputy to the Parliament of Italy in the 2018 Italian general election for the Legislature XVIII of Italy.

Career
Ianaro was born on August 28, 1967, in Benevento.

She was elected to the Italian Parliament in the 2018 Italian general election, representing the Five Star Movement.

References

Living people
Five Star Movement politicians
1967 births
Deputies of Legislature XVIII of Italy
People from Benevento
21st-century Italian women politicians
20th-century Italian women
Women members of the Chamber of Deputies (Italy)